Tanvir Ahmed Dar (4 June 1937 – 11 February 1998) was a Pakistani field hockey player who played as a fullback. He was born in Amritsar, Punjab, British India. He won a gold medal at the 1968 Summer Olympics in Mexico City. He played for Pakistan between 1965 and 1974.

Dar was an established penalty-corner-shooter from the 1960s. He helped Pakistan win the Asian Games title in 1970 and the inaugural World Hockey Cup in 1971 in Barcelona, Spain.

After his elder brother Munir had retired from hockey, the brothers established a hockey academy in Lahore, which was later named after Tanvir Dar — Tanvir Dar Hockey Academy.

Awards and recognition
Pride of Performance Award in 1971 by the President of Pakistan.

References

External links

1937 births
1998 deaths
People from Lahore
Pakistani male field hockey players
Olympic field hockey players of Pakistan
Olympic gold medalists for Pakistan
Olympic medalists in field hockey
Medalists at the 1968 Summer Olympics
Field hockey players at the 1968 Summer Olympics
Asian Games medalists in field hockey
Medalists at the 1970 Asian Games
Field hockey players at the 1970 Asian Games
Asian Games gold medalists for Pakistan
Recipients of the Pride of Performance